Rhys Evans is an English footballer.

Rhys Evans may also refer to:

Rhys Evans (rugby league) (born 1992), rugby league player
Arise Evans (1607–1660), or Rhys Evans, Welsh prophet and fanatic

See also
Rhys Ifans (born 1967), actor
Tim Rhys-Evans (born c. 1972), Welsh conductor